Sabine Hack (born 12 July 1969) is a former professional tennis player from Germany. She began her career on the WTA Tour in 1983. She won four singles and one doubles titles in her career. Her best Grand Slam performance was reaching the quarterfinals at the 1994 French Open. Hack reached a career-high ranking of No. 13 in the world in January 1995. She retired from the tour in 1997.

WTA tour finals

Singles (4 titles, 4 runners-up)

Doubles (1 title, 1 runner-up)

ITF finals

Singles (1–3)

Doubles (0–1)

External links 
 
 
 

1969 births
Living people
Sportspeople from Ulm
German female tennis players
West German female tennis players
Tennis people from Baden-Württemberg